"Koala" is a song by Dutch DJ and producer Oliver Heldens. It was released as a digital download on 16 July 2014 in the Netherlands. The song was written and produced by Oliver Heldens. The song peaked at number 42 in the Netherlands, and has also charted in Belgium.

The vocal cover of this song named "Last All Night (Koala)" was released onto YouTube on 8 October 2014 under the channel of FFRR.

Music video
A music video to accompany the release of "Koala" was first released onto YouTube on 13 August 2014 at a total length of two minutes and fifty-three seconds.

Track listing

Chart performance

Weekly charts

Release history

Last All Night (Koala)

Oliver Heldens released a second version of the song titled "Last All Night (Koala)" featuring guest vocals from KStewart. It was released as a digital download on 7 December 2014. It has peaked to number 5 on the UK Singles Chart.

Track listing

Chart performance

Release history

References

Songs about mammals
2014 singles
2014 songs
Oliver Heldens songs
Spinnin' Records singles
Songs written by Oliver Heldens
Songs written by MNEK
Songs written by Becky Hill